Michael Warren II (born November 12, 1998) is an American football running back who is a free agent. In high school, he won Ohio's Mr. Football Award while playing for Central Catholic in Toledo. He attended the University of Cincinnati and played for the Bearcats, where he holds their single-season rushing touchdowns record. He signed with the Philadelphia Eagles as an undrafted free agent in 2020 and has also been a member of the Carolina Panthers and Washington Football Team.

High school
He went to high school at Central Catholic High School in Toledo, Ohio. He was honored as Mr. Football Award (Ohio) in 2016. He averaged 8.95 yards per carry that season and holds the school’s single-game rushing record with 385 yards against Lima Senior High School in 2016.

College career
At University of Cincinnati, he played running back and kick returner in his freshman year. On November 10, 2018, in a game against the University of Central Florida, he rushed for three touchdowns and caught a touchdown pass. He set a school record of 19 touchdowns in a single season, and became the school's 12th 1,000-yard rusher. The most recent was George Winn in 2012.

In 2019 he passed Robert Cooper to become the 6th ranked all-time rusher for the Bearcats, with a career total of 2,918 yards.  Following this season, Warren declared for the 2020 NFL Draft, forgoing his senior year.

Statistics

Professional career

Philadelphia Eagles
Warren was signed by the Philadelphia Eagles as an undrafted free agent following the 2020 NFL Draft on April 26, 2020. He was waived on September 3, 2020 and re-signed to the practice squad. He was released on September 29, 2020.

Carolina Panthers
On October 20, 2020, Warren was signed to the Carolina Panthers' practice squad, but was released two days later.

Washington Football Team
Warren signed with the Washington Football Team's practice squad on December 9, 2020. He was elevated to the active roster on December 19 for the team's week 15 game against the Seattle Seahawks, and reverted to the practice squad after the game. He was released on December 29, 2020, and rejoined them on a reserve/futures contract on January 15, 2021, before being waived again on April 9, 2021.

Detroit Lions
Warren signed with the Detroit Lions on June 4, 2021. He was waived/injured on August 11, 2021 and placed on injured reserve. He was released on August 16.

See also
Cincinnati Bearcats football statistical leaders

References

1998 births
Living people
Sportspeople from Toledo, Ohio
American football running backs
Carolina Panthers players
Cincinnati Bearcats football players
Detroit Lions players
Philadelphia Eagles players
Players of American football from Ohio
Washington Football Team players